Graham Travis Watt (born 18 August 1976) is an Australian politician. He was a member of the Victorian Legislative Assembly from 2010 to 2018, representing the seat of Burwood. He is a member of the Liberal Party.

Early life
As an Australian junior Champion and State Champion, Watt had the opportunity to travel both interstate and overseas for Athletics. In 2004, he walked a hundred miles in 24 hours, to become an Australian centurion, something achieved by only 48 people on Australian soil, at that time.

Watt graduated from Edith Cowan University, obtaining a Bachelor of Business, and majoring in Finance and Economics. He has since been the owner of a mobile phone retail store and a carpet cleaning business.

Political career
Watt ran for the Liberal Party in 2002 and 2006 in the electoral district of Northcote, losing to Mary Delahunty in 2002 and Fiona Richardson in 2006.

In 2009 he was preselected as the Liberal candidate for the electorate of Burwood, which he won at the 2010 Victorian election, defeating the sitting Labor member Bob Stensholt.

He was re-elected in the 2014 Victorian election with 50.1% of the primary vote and 53.17% of the 2 candidate preferred vote, but was defeated in 2018 Victorian State Election.

References

External links
 Parliamentary voting record of Graham Watt at Victorian Parliament Tracker
 http://vic.liberal.org.au/team/GrahamWatt
 http://www.grahamwatt.com.au/

1976 births
Living people
Edith Cowan University alumni
Members of the Victorian Legislative Assembly
People from Norseman, Western Australia
Liberal Party of Australia members of the Parliament of Victoria
21st-century Australian politicians
Western Australian politicians